The Algonquin Galleria Center is an outdoor shopping mall at the southeast corner of Randall Road and County Line Road in Algonquin, Illinois. Similar to the existing Algonquin Commons across the street, it will be an outdoor mall, or lifestyle center, with stores spread out in multiple buildings, allowing shoppers to drive up to their favorite store. The Galleria is intended to be an upscale mall, not a typical power center it features; high quality aesthetics, striking architecture, one of the largest agglomerations of furniture retailers in the area,a cluster of restaurants, specialty stores, and a Bowlero bowling facility to serve as the center's entertainment complex.

The center was to be built in three major phases over a period of five to seven years. Phase I is the only one completed The project was developed by Oak Brook-based Mid-America Development Partners, LLC.

The Algonquin Galleria and Algonquin Commons combine to form the second largest retail complex in the state of Illinois.

Anchors
Best Buy
Bowlero
Jo-Ann Stores
La-Z-Boy
Deli 4 You

Restaurants
Potbelly
Golden Corral
Longhorn Steakhouse

See also
Algonquin Commons
Randall Road
Algonquin, Illinois
Esplanade (Algonquin)

References

External links
Mid America Development's Algonquin Galleria property listing

Algonquin, Illinois
Shopping malls in Kane County, Illinois
Shopping malls established in 2006
Buildings and structures under construction in the United States